The Roslyn Packer Theatre Walsh Bay is a theatre in Sydney, New South Wales, Australia. It seats up to 896 people. Originally named as the Sydney Theatre, the theatre was renamed in March 2015 in honour of Roslyn Packer , the widow of Kerry Packer. James Packer and family made a philanthropic gift to the Sydney Theatre Company in advance of the renaming.

The theatre is used by the Sydney Theatre Company, the Sydney Dance Company and the Sydney Writers' Festival.

References

Theatres in Sydney
Theatres completed in 2004
Dawes Point, New South Wales